Viechtach is a town in the district of Regen in Bavaria in Germany. It is situated on the river Schwarzer Regen, 31 km northeast of Straubing, and it is known for the quartz mountains nearby.

References

Regen (district)